Ayman Taher Kandil (born January 7, 1966) is a former Egyptian goalkeeper, who played for Zamalek and Egypt. Taher was a member of the Egyptian squad for the 1990 FIFA World Cup as back-up for Ahmed Shobair.

References

1966 births
Living people
Egyptian footballers
Egypt international footballers
1990 FIFA World Cup players
Zamalek SC players
Egyptian football managers
Place of birth missing (living people)
Egyptian Premier League players
Association football goalkeepers